DALI stands for Danish Audiophile Loudspeaker Industries, a Danish manufacturer of high-end loudspeakers. The company was founded in 1983 by Peter Lyngdorf, as an attempt to comply with the still increasing demands on audio quality from the Hi-Fi community.

DALI loudspeakers have traditionally been sold primarily within Scandinavia, but the company has ambitious plans to get among the largest loudspeaker manufacturers in the world. As of 2011, DALI is represented in more than 65 countries all over the world.

One of the best-known DALI products is the DALI MegaLine series of high-end loudspeakers.

DALI timeline 

 1983 - DALI is founded
 1986 - Moving into the new facilities in Nørager, Hobro
 1987 - Launch of first top end model: DALI 40 and DALI 40 SE
 1990 - Earliest export activities
 1996 - MEGALINE is introduced as DALI's state of the art and reference loudspeaker
 1997 - Launch of DALI GRAND series (GRAND, GRAND Diva und GRAND Coupé)
 2001 - Expanding internationally - and opening of DALI Germany sales office
 2002 - Introduction of the high end series EUPHONIA
 2004 - Launch of HELICON & CONCEPT series
 2005 - Opening UK sales office
 2006 - Launch of the MENTOR series, successor of GRAND series. DALI is by now exporting to more than 50 countries
 2007 - Launch of the HELICON MK2 series
 2008 - MOTIF LCR, HELICON 400 LE 25th, and the LEKTOR series are launched
 2009 - Introduction of the first in-ceiling loudspeaker; KOMPAS 6M becomes a part of the PHANTOM family
 2010 - The IKON MK2 series is introduced, the IKON 6 MK2 winning the international EISA award and named "European Loudspeaker 2010-2011". Launch of the quadratic PHANTOM LEKTOR install loudspeaker in December 2010.
 2011 - Sees the launch of brand new DALI products. In Spring, The FAZON F5 speaker as well as the ZENSOR series are introduced, and DALI enters the social medias. The FAZON F5 receives an EISA Award for Best Product AUDIO DESIGN 2011-2012. DALI now also exports to 65 countries (2011).
 2012 - Introduction to the new Linear Drive Magnet System with the Launch of the innovative reference speaker line, the EPICON series. The EPICON 8 receives an EISA Award for Best Product HIGH-END AUDIO 2012-2013.
 2013 - Launch of the first truly active, portable Bluetooth speaker from DALI, the KUBIK FREE + XTRA, which received an EISA Award.
 2014 - The launch of the RUBICON series with inherited SMC technology from the EPICON series and in-house made woofers. The KUBIK ONE sound system was added to the active KUBIK family.
 2017 - The launch of the SPEKTOR series.
 2018 - The launch of the OBERON series, marketed as entry-level speakers which include SMC technology.
 2019 - The launch of the company's first headphones, IO-4 and IO-6.

Speaker ranges of January 2015

KUBIK 
Active speakers with Bluetooth, USB, optical og Analog input.

ZENSOR

LEKTOR

FAZON

IKON MK2

MENTOR 
DALI MENTOR is a series built since 2006.

RUBICON

EPICON 

EPICON cabinet - A rigid construction is necessary to optimize the working environment for both woofers and tweeter. The front baffle, sides and top of the EPICON speakers are heated in a process that allows us to press them into an organic shape. This design increases overall rigidity and severely reduces cabinet resonances. Furthermore, standing waves are practically eliminated as there are no parallel surfaces reflecting sound waves.

OBERON 

OBERON is the first entry-level loudspeaker to incorporate DALI’s patented SMC technology, drastically reducing non-linear magnetic distortion. With new oversized tweeters, wide-dispersion wood-fibre woofers and striking Danish cabinet design, OBERON sets a new benchmark for affordable audiophile speakers.

Technology 
2012 saw the introduction of the new Linear Drive Magnet System included in its latest offering the EPICON series and in late 2014 the RUBICON is the second series with this patented DALI technology.

Awards 
The FAZON F5 also introduced in 2012 received an EISA award for best product audio design 2011-2012, the EPICON 8 received best product HIGH END AUDIO 2012-2013 and the Rubicon LCR received an EISA award for best onwall product 2014-2015

EISA Awards

Products (Discontinued)

Blue series 
The DALI Blue series was built between 1980 and 2000.

CONCEPT 
The DALI Concept 10 is a very large floorstanding model standing at over 1.3m tall and weighing 35 kg. The box has 3 separate enclosures. It has two 10 inch woofers in a separate ported enclosure, a 6.5 midrange and dome tweeter in a top sealed enclosure. The Concept range makes up of several models Floorstanders, Bookshelf and Centre Channels.
It is the successor of the DALI Blue series.

References

External links
Official DALI homepage

Audio equipment manufacturers of Denmark
Loudspeaker manufacturers
Danish companies established in 1983
Danish brands
Companies based in Rebild Municipality